Art Walker may refer to:

 Art Walker (gridiron football) (1933–1973), American gridiron football player
 Art Walker (triple jumper) (born 1941), American triple jumper

See also 
 Arthur Walker (disambiguation)